Cyperus gracilis, with the common name is slender flat sedge and slimjim flatsedge, is a sedge native to Australia. The species epithet gracilis refers to the graceful form of the leaves.

The plant grows  in height, with a delicate arching form. Flowering occurs in spring and summer.

Distribution
Cyperus gracilis is found from the state of Victoria, north to New South Wales and Queensland, in eastern Australia. Its habitat can range from high rainfall areas near the coast to drier areas in woodlands, such as Lightning Ridge. It is also naturalized in Norfolk Island, the Canary Islands, Hawaii, and California.

See also
List of Cyperus species

References 

gracilis
Flora of New South Wales
Flora of Victoria (Australia)
Flora of Queensland
Plants described in 1810
Taxa named by Robert Brown (botanist, born 1773)